Russell M. Robinson II (born 1932) is founding partner of the Charlotte, North Carolina law firm Robinson, Bradshaw & Hinson, P.A., and author of the definitive Robinson on North Carolina Corporation Law, Permanent (7th) Edition, which is now owned by and will be maintained under the control of Duke University School of Law. He is a member of the American Law Institute and the Fourth Circuit Judicial Conference, a Fellow of the American Bar Association, and served for many years as chairman of the North Carolina Business Corporation Act Drafting Committee.

Among other civic, educational and foundation activities, Robinson has served as a trustee of The Duke Endowment Since 1987, he has been chairman of its Health Care and Child Care Divisions (1990–2001) and board of trustees (2001–present). He served as director and chairman of the UNC Charlotte Foundation.

Robinson received his undergraduate degree, Phi Beta Kappa, from Princeton University. He earned his law degree from Duke University School of Law, where he was a member of the Order of the Coif, received the Willis Smith Award and served as editor-in-chief of the Duke Law Journal. Robinson served as president of the Mecklenburg County Bar, as a member of the board of governors and executive committee for the North Carolina Bar Association and as director of legal services of Southern Piedmont. He received the Judge John J. Parker Award Judge John J. Parker Award, an award created by the North Carolina Bar Association to honor members of the North Carolina Bar who have demonstrated excellence and who have rendered distinguished services to the profession, state and nation, in 1993.

Life
Robinson is the son of John Mosley Robinson and the grandson of William B. Rodman, who was a justice of the North Carolina Supreme Court and the principal draftsman of the North Carolina Constitution of 1868. His uncle, William B. Rodman III, usually called William B. Rodman Jr., served as Attorney General of North Carolina. He is married to Sally Dalton Robinson and they have three children.

References

External links
 Robinson Bradshaw & Hinson Web site
 Legal Elite: Russell M. Robinson II

Living people
1930 births
Duke University School of Law alumni
Lawyers from Charlotte, North Carolina
American legal writers
North Carolina lawyers
Writers from Charlotte, North Carolina
Princeton University alumni